This was the first edition of the tournament.

Seeds

 unknown player has withdrawn
  Andrew Sznajder (second round)
  Mark Koevermans (semifinals)
  Omar Camporese (semifinals)
  Bruno Orešar (second round)
  Christian Miniussi (second round)
  Fernando Luna (second round)
  Magnus Larsson

Draw

Finals

Top half

Bottom half

References
 Main Draw

Slovenia
1990 in tennis
1990 in Slovenian tennis
Tennis tournaments in Slovenia
BMW Ljubljana Open